Sony Dream Machine was Sony Electronics' long-running line of clock radios. Models ranged from basic AM/FM models to more expensive models including iPod/iPhone docking, a LCD screen, projectors, and internet connectivity.

The line was started in the early 1960's and ran until the early 2010's.

History 
In the mid 1960's, Sony introduced the first Dream Machine. Many of these older models are not well known because of poor record keeping. By the early 70's, Sony was selling thousands of it, every holiday season. It was one of the first widely adopted digital appliances in the home. By the mid 1980's, there were plenty of other options for digital clocks, although the Dream Machine still remained a popular option. For a short time in the late 2000's, the radio clock market experienced a boom, because of several new ones including iPod / iPhone 30 pin docks and CD players. By the early 2010's, Sony stopped manufacturing new clocks under the "Dream Machine" name. At the time of discontinuation, the name was used for over forty years.

Models

8FC-59W 
One of the first clock radios, released in 1968. The clock displays the time by a mechanical flip mechanism. It has a alarm and also has an FM and AM radio.

ICF-CL75iP
The device has a 7 inch touch screen that can be used as a photo frame, alarm clock, radio, and iPod dock. It has a 30 pin dock on the right side of the clock. Engadget knocked the limited codec support, but lauded the attractive design and low ($149.95) announced price tag. They also suggested Sony should add Chumby widget support, a wish Sony later granted with their Dash alarm clock. CNet Australia felt that although it was missing some features consumers might expect from stand-alone devices, the combination of functionality makes up for the shortcomings of each of its parts.

ICF-CD3iP
Has a round face. The model's speakers were criticised, but the model has a CD tray, and was sold relatively cheap.

ICF-C318
A clock radio with a large display and two independent alarms, which can be set to a radio or buzzer. Other features include a 0.9" green LED display, an extendable snooze bar, a built-in calendar with automatic daylight saving time adjustment and a lithium battery for a full power memory back up. Battery life is approximately up to 250 Days with the Sony battery. The model also has a built-in AM/FM radio, with a Ferrite bar antenna for AM, a wire antenna for FM, and mono 66mm speakers.

ICF-C303
A Pill Synthesized Clock radio that had a digital tuner, and many features. Has hidden set controls that is used to set up the clock, has dual alarms, 7 preset stations, and AM and FM radio.

ICF-C218

A clock radio that is similar to the ICF-C318 with the Green LED Display, but it has a single alarm instead of a dual alarm. Same features as the ICF-C318, but it is a different design and almost as the same as the C318. It comes with two bands; FM and AM.

ICF-C414
A clock radio with an extra large Green LED 1.4 inch display, it is the same as the ICF-C318, but it is a bigger display. Dual alarms and radio bands, FM and AM. Also it has a melody alarm (ALARM B Only).

ICF-C2W
A clock radio that has a single alarm, vintage like style, and is a standard alarm clock. No battery backup.

ICF-C3W
A clock radio that is very similar like the C2W, but it has a different alarm sound, and a different time when you plug it in instead of the “12:00 AM” flash.

ICF-C10W

An FM/AM digital clock radio with a cube dimension of 4.5 inches all around. It was Probably an older generation of CXW family digital radio with more improved features like DREAM BAR on the top panel and a 9-volt battery backup at the bottom panel like C317. It must be the first model in the CXW family with the backup battery feature since it had a sticker label reminding consumers of this special feature - "POWER BACK-UP REST ASSURED SYSTEM". The front face shows the blue LEDs for the time and the bar dials for FM/AM stations. On the top panel, it had a large rectangular snooze button, and a small round ALARM RESET button in a shallow depressed hole so the Dreamer can feel the depression without looking to cancel the alarm instead of hitting the snooze bar. It also had a SLEEP button to leave the radio on from 10 minutes long to 60 minutes long with 10-minute setting intervals. It had both RADIO and BUZZER options. The right side panel has two rounded discs for VOLUME and TUNING adjustments. The left side panel is the speaker.

ICF-C317
A clock radio produced in the early 2000s that has a large, round snooze button, as well as a buzzer/radio alarm. It supports AM and FM bands, with a tuner and volume adjuster located on the side. Shows a seconds display when you hold down the snooze button. The LEDs are green, showing a twelve hour time display, with an indicator on the left side of the face to show AM and PM. Most were made in silver and grey, with four short 'legs' at the bottom of its square body. A 9V battery can be inserted to back up time in the event of power outages.

ICF-C492
A clock radio that is similar to the C317, but it has a Large display, Same features as the C317.

ICF-C390
A clock radio with a flat, half-disc shape, in white or black body, and red or green LED display. AM and FM bands (analog tuner), dual alarms (buzzer + radio), volume knob. Mains powered but it has a 9V backup battery.

ICF-CS650
A big clock radio that has a Cassette Player, Dual alarms, AM and FM bands, and Green LED’s.

ICF-C470
A clock radio that has a different alarm sound and has a volume control and two different alarms. This one comes in the MK2 version as well, It has a red LED display, and for the MK2, it has a green LED display. The first alarm is a radio alarm and the second one is the buzzer, Two bands; FM and AM.

ICF-CD853
A clock radio with an FM Radio and a CD player. It features a 8 cm Orange LED display with different brightness options.
Almost round in shape. Came in silver and black colors. Small footprint. Circa 2002.

ICF-C717PJ  
The clock is long and rectangular, akin to a sound bar. The main selling point of this clock is the nature sounds for the alarm, and a rear projector that can project the time. Released in 2010.

References

Notes
https://archive.today/20130130194712/http://nexus404.com/Blog/2009/09/04/sony-icf-cl75ip-dream-machine-7-in-800x480-lcd-screen-1gb-internal-memory-10-second-voice-recording-for-alarm/
http://news.cnet.com/8301-17938_105-10186055-1.html

Sony hardware
Clock designs